Teutobochus or Theutobochus was a legendary giant and king of the Teutons. Large bones discovered in France in 1613 were claimed to be his skeleton.

History 
In 1869 W.A. Seaver wrote: "In times more modern (1613), some masons digging near the ruins of a castle in Dauphiné, in a field which by tradition had long been called 'The Giant's Field,' at a depth of 18 feet discovered a brick tomb 30 feet long, 12 feet wide, and 8 feet high, on which was a gray stone with the words 'Theutobochus Rex' cut thereon. When the tomb was opened they found a human skeleton entire, 25-1/2 feet long, 10 feet wide across the shoulders, and 5 feet deep from the breast to the back. His teeth were about the size of an ox's foot, and his shin-bone measured 4 feet in length."

The bones were displayed in Paris by Pierre Mazurier, a surgeon who claimed to be one of the finders.

After the finding of the bones, the legend of the king Teutobochus, which was thought to be the Teuton king defeated by Caius Marius, spread despite analysis by anatomist Jean Riolan the Younger, who ascribed the bones to one of Hannibal's elephants. The French scholar Peiresc also demonstrated that such bones belong to elephants. Theutobochus mentioned by Robert Plot in his Natural history of Oxfordshire, 1677, along with the other known giant skeletons.

Much later, the zoologist Henri Marie Ducrotay de Blainville analyzed the bones and concluded they came from a mastodon. Finally in the 1984, the paleontologist  analyzed a plaster mold from Paris' Muséum national d'histoire naturelle, that came from the giant bones, and identified a Deinotherium. The bones are housed in the Gallery of Paleontology and Comparative Anatomy.

See also 
 Teutobod
 Giant of Castelnau
 Patagon
 Og
 Orestes
 List of tallest people#Disputed and unverified claims

References 

European mythology
Giants